The 2007 Sacrifice was a professional wrestling pay-per-view event produced by Total Nonstop Action Wrestling (TNA), which took place on May 13, 2007 at the Impact Zone in Orlando, Florida. It was the third event under the Sacrifice chronology. Nine matches were featured on the event's card.

In October 2017, with the launch of the Global Wrestling Network, the event became available to stream on demand. It would later be available on Impact Plus in May 2019.

Production

Background
On this morning, before the airing of the event, Vice President of the National Wrestling Alliance (NWA) stripped Christian Cage of the NWA World Heavyweight Championship and Team 3D of the NWA World Tag Team Championships due to Cage's refusal to defend the World Title in various NWA territories.  The NWA severed all ties with TNA, although the affected champions still had physical possession of the belts. The affected champions defended their titles at the event.

Storylines
Nine matches were featured on the event's card. The event featured wrestlers from pre-existing scripted feuds and storylines. Wrestlers portrayed villains, heroes, or less distinguishable characters in the scripted events that built tension and culminated in a wrestling match or series of matches.

Results

References

Impact Wrestling Sacrifice
2007 in professional wrestling in Florida
Professional wrestling in Orlando, Florida
Events in Orlando, Florida
May 2007 events in the United States
2007 Total Nonstop Action Wrestling pay-per-view events